Captain Germán Olano Moreno Air Base  is a Colombian military base assigned to the Colombian Air Force (Fuerza Aérea Colombiana or FAC) Combat Air Command No. 1 (Comando Aéreo de Combate No. 1 or CACOM 1). The base is located in Palanquero, near Puerto Salgar, in the Cundinamarca department of Colombia. It is named in honor of Captain Germán Olano Moreno.

Facilities 

History 
Officially inaugurated August 27, 1933 by the president of the republic Enrique Olaya Herrera, as the national airport of La Dorada.

In 1932, due to the conflict with Peru, the idea to create a base in a central strategic location was gaining hold. Back then the Hacienda Palanquero was already in use as an airport by the Colombian-German airline Scadta since 1919.

Accidents and incidents
On 31 December 2014, A Colombian Air Force IAI Kfir C10 combat aircraft from 111 Squadron of the 1st Combat Air Command (CACOM-1) crashed while undertaking a training mission over La Dorada in Caldas. The pilot ejected following a technical failure while on approach to the Palanquero airbase in Puerto Salgar, Cundinamarca. 
On 18 February 2009, Basler BT-67 FAC 1670 of the Colombian Air Force crashed near the base on a local training flight. All five crew were killed.
On 15 May 2009, FAC 3031 Dassault Mirage 5 of the Colombian Air Force crashed above the 36 heading after a failed take-off. The pilot made the emergency procedures and ejected, leaving unharmed.

See also

Transport in Colombia
List of airports in Colombia

References

Airports in Colombia
Colombian Air Force
Buildings and structures in Cundinamarca Department
Military installations of Colombia
1933 establishments in Colombia
Military airbases established in 1933